The 1998–99 Élite Ligue season was the 78th season of the Élite Ligue, the top level of ice hockey in France. 10 teams participated in the league, and HC Amiens Somme won their first league title.

Regular season

Playoffs

External links
Season on hockeyarchives.info

France
1998–99 in French ice hockey
Ligue Magnus seasons